Cristiana Ferrando was the defending champion, but lost in the first round to Maria Sanchez.

Julia Glushko won the title after defeating Arina Rodionova 6–4, 6–3 in the final.

Seeds

Draw

Finals

Top half

Bottom half

References
Main Draw

Challenger Banque Nationale de Granby - Singles
Challenger de Granby